is a former Japanese professional boxer in the featherweight (126 lb) division. He is a former WBC world featherweight champion.

Childhood and early career 
Koshimoto's parents divorced shortly after he was born, and Koshimoto was raised single-handedly by his father. He played baseball during his early teens, but took up boxing when his father founded a boxing gym in his local town. His father would be his trainer throughout his amateur and professional career. His amateur record was 6-6 (6 RSC).

Professional career 
Koshimoto made his debut in November 1992. In 1996, he won the Japanese featherweight title, which he defended 6 times before returning.

In January, 2001, he challenged Freddie Norwood for the WBA featherweight title, but lost by 9th-round TKO. This was his first professional loss. Later that year, he won the OPBF featherweight title, which he defended 7 times before returning.

Koshimoto got his second world title shot on January 29, 2006, fighting WBC featherweight champion Injin Chi. He won by 12-round decision, becoming the oldest Japanese boxer to win a world title, at 35 years of age. Koshimoto was paid almost nothing for the fight, since his gym had funded all the money needed for the title match.

On July 30, 2006, he fought WBC Youth Champion Rodolfo López for his first defense, losing by 7th-round TKO. Koshimoto was hospitalized after the fight, and promptly announced his retirement. His record was 39-2-2 (17KOs).

Post retirement 
His father and trainer, Hidetake Koshimoto, was head of the Fukuoka Boxing Gym, and he replaced his father after his retirement. He currently trains aspiring boxers at the gym.

See also 
 List of WBC world champions
 List of Japanese boxing world champions
 Boxing in Japan

External links 
 
 FBS Profile (Japanese)

1971 births
Featherweight boxers
Living people
Sportspeople from Fukuoka (city)
Southpaw boxers
World Boxing Council champions
World boxing champions
Japanese male boxers